Elaine Catherine Corrigan O'Brien Donnelly (August 1, 1955 – February 21, 2014) was an American flight instructor and politician.

Born in Medford, Massachusetts, O'Brien received her bachelor's degree from Pennsylvania State University and her masters from Westfield State University, She had multiple careers, including in aviation as a pilot and flight instructor, and in state and local government. She served on the local board of education and as town clerk. She then served in the Connecticut House of Representatives, from Suffield, Connecticut, as a Democrat from 2010 until her death in 2014.

She died in West Hartford, Connecticut from glioblastoma at the age of 58. She is survived by her husband and three sons.

Notes

1955 births
2014 deaths
People from Suffield, Connecticut
Politicians from Medford, Massachusetts
Pennsylvania State University alumni
Westfield State University alumni
Women state legislators in Connecticut
Democratic Party members of the Connecticut House of Representatives
Deaths from brain cancer in the United States
Deaths from cancer in Connecticut
Flight instructors
21st-century American women